The Weekly Pro Wrestling Tokyo Dome Show, often referred to as Bridge of Dreams, was a multi-promotional professional wrestling event hosted by Japanese wrestling magazine, Weekly Pro Wrestling. The event took place on April 2, 1995 at the Tokyo Dome in Tokyo, Japan.

Event details
The event was a multi-promotional wrestling event. According to Dave Meltzer, the event was only initially supposed to have 8 promotions. However, due to increased interest, 13 promotions from Japan took part in the event.  Genichiro Tenryu's WAR promotion notably did not take part in the event as they had a previous planned event the same day at Korakuen Hall. Weekly Gong, another Japanese wrestling magazine, did not cover "Bridge of Dreams", opting instead to cover WAR's event leading that event to be nicknamed, the "Anti-Dream Bridge". Tokyo Sports reported on the event, but did not mention that it was hosted by Weekly Pro Wrestling. Baseball Sha Magazine, a mainstream sports magazine that is the sister company of Weekly Pro Wrestling, briefly covered the event.

The event was not released officially on video due to issues with the companies involved, with only unofficial recordings of the event existing.

Participating promotions

Results

See also

Professional wrestling in Japan
List of professional wrestling promotions in Japan

References

1995 in professional wrestling
1995 in Japan
April 1995 events in Asia
Events in Tokyo
Professional wrestling in Tokyo
Professional wrestling joint events